Deris Rural District is a rural district (dehestan) in the Central District of Kazerun County, Fars Province, Iran. At the 2006 census, its population was 20,503, in 4,525 families.  The rural district has 46 villages.

References 

Rural Districts of Fars Province
Kazerun County